Suji is a small village in the Pare Mountains, in the Kilimanjaro region of north-eastern Tanzania.  According to the 2002 census, the village has a population of around 8,072  (Male: 3,974, Female: 4,098). The majority of the villagers are of the Pare tribe (legend holds that they moved up the mountains as a security measure in a similar way other villages built forts. Their main antagonists were Maasai warriors who they call 'Kwavi'.  The village is situated approximately 20 km from Makanya, a town on the main Dar es Salaam - Moshi road.  In terms of religion, the majority of the residents are Seventh Day Adventists.

Transportation

Kilimanjaro International Airport, situated between Moshi and Arusha is the nearest airport. Villagers rely on shuttle minibuses to transport them up and down the mountain. Suji secondary school together with the SDA church own a roadworthy truck. This is used in case of an emergency.

Amenities

Suji has electricity and clean running water in most homes. Telephones, (landlines and mobile phones) are widely used, although with interrupted coverage. A few villagers also have satellite television.

The village has the following amenities:
 Local shops and marketplace
 Mission Guest House
 Clinic / Dispensary
 SDA church (From 1903)
 Primary & Secondary schools
 Shamge's Pub
 Eneza's Hotel
 patron's house

Education
In addition to primary schools, there are 2 secondary school; Suji High School and Malindi Secondary School.  
Suji High School was officially started on  28 February 1985. The School had two classrooms and four teachers, Singo Andrew K, (the headmaster), Mathayo Fue Mkwizu, Mngale, karani alex and John Kilonzo. Later on others joined the school; Kazani Yonafika Chambi, Mkitunda and Christopher Chambi, to mention a few. In 1988, Suji Secondary School released its first O-Level leavers.
It operates under the ownership and management of Seventh Day Adventist Church in North East Tanzania Conference. Suji has along history as primary school, teachers training centre and secondary school. The school was found by the Germany missionaries of SDA Church in 1906. Later developed to become a primary school and teacher training centre in 1926.
In 1927 the first qualified teachers graduated with Government Teaching Certificate;it thus, produced the first qualified female teacher in Tanganyika in 1931 namely Ms. Damari Kangalu.
The school ceased to offer Teacher Training centre in 1945 and continue as a middle school (Std I-VII) until 1965 when the Government nationalized all primary schools, and was downsized to Std VII.
In 1984 Suji community requested the SDA Church to open and run the secondary school. The primary school was relocated.
The secondary school was then started in 1985. It was registered in 1987 with a Reg. No. S.283; and later was accepted to be a National Examination Centre No.489. The first form four examination was done in November 1988. In September 1999, Suji attain new status of being a high school. Science then, its enrolment include for one through six. The first form six examination was done in May 2001.

Hamlets/Townships/Areas
Kirangare
Malindi
Chankanga
Gonjanza
jamia
Ngale
Mng'ende
Kitunda
Tae
Chome
Bwambo
Ivuga
Mpinji
Myamba
Parane
Ndungu
Chairika
Heidaru
Shigati
Hempungi
Kisimeni
Ikondova
Heivu
Nkogo
Mvuteni
Ninga
Heirioko
Mweteni

See also 
Kilimanjaro Region
Same District

Sources and external links
 Tanzania Government Census 2002
 Suji Seventh-day Adventist Dispensary.  P.O. Box 26; Suji, Same; Tanzania
 Suji High School.  P.O. Box 351, Same, Kilimanjaro, Tanzania.
 Peace Corps service in Suji
 SDA Clinics
 Birds of the South Pare Mountains
 Suji Village Renewal
 NUI graduates volunteer in Suji

References 

Populated places in Kilimanjaro Region